Miss International 1970, the 10th anniversary of the Miss International pageant, was held on May 16, 1970 at the Exposition Hall Fairgrounds in Osaka, Japan. 47 contestants competed for the pageant. Aurora Pijuan from Philippines was crowned Miss International 1970 at the end of the event by outgoing titleholder, Valerie Holmes from Britain.

Results

Placements

Contestants

  - Margarita Marta Briese
  - Karen Patricia Papworth
  - Ilse Wolfgang
  - Heidi LeLeu
  - Nelly Zenteno Pereira
  - Jacqueline Francesca Molloy
  - Branimira Antonova
  - Jacquie Perrin
  - Shirlene Minerva De Silva
  - Berta Goldsmith
  - Pita Kaluuya
  - Julia Haydée Brenes
  - Jeanne Perfeldt
  - Lourdes Hernández
  - Irene Karvola
  - Dominique Pasquier
  - Silke Maria Kahl
  - Katerina Sakka
  - Flora C. Baza
  - Yvonne Haunani Young
  - Marjolein Abbing
  - Cecilia W. Buckley
  - Erla Hardardóttir
  - Patricia D’Souza
  - Louise Maengkom
  - Anne Marie Murphy
  - Rossela Ambrosiani
  - Toshie Suda
  - Kim In-sook
  - Gaby Fejean
  - Lucy Lee
  - Cecile Aguis
  - Lidia Goni
  - Susan Frances Greaves
  - Jossie Salinas
  - Tone Knaran
  - Aurora Pijuan
  - Maria do Rosário de Freitas
  - Margaret Tan Quee Lin
  - Maria García
  - Rita Rudolfsson Bengtsson
  - Yolanda Gahwiler
  - Panarat Pisutthisak
  - Meral Ekmekcioglu
  - Randi Susan Blesener
  - Marzia Piazza
  - Zdenka Marn

Notes

Did not compete
  - Nara Rubia Vieira Monteiro
  - Myriam Bellini Ayala

1970
1970 beauty pageants
Beauty pageants in Japan
1970 in Japan